Bashir Babajanzadeh Darzi (born 9 or 20 August 1989) is a heavyweight Greco-Roman wrestler from Iran. He won bronze medals at the 2011 World Championships and 2014 Asian Games, and reached the quarterfinals at the 2016 Olympics. He was suspended for doping, for four years from 31 August 2016 until 30 August 2020, by United World Wrestling which found the presence of testosterone, an anabolic steroid.

References

External links
 

Living people
1989 births
Iranian male sport wrestlers
Olympic wrestlers of Iran
Wrestlers at the 2012 Summer Olympics
Wrestlers at the 2016 Summer Olympics
Wrestlers at the 2014 Asian Games
Asian Games bronze medalists for Iran
Asian Games medalists in wrestling
World Wrestling Championships medalists
Iranian sportspeople in doping cases
People from Babol
Medalists at the 2014 Asian Games
Sportspeople from Mazandaran province
21st-century Iranian people